The 1990 Institute is a San Francisco-based not-for-profit organization with a mission to champion fair and equal treatment for Asian Americans and a constructive U.S.-China relationship through leadership, education, and collaboration. The institute has had three decades of impact with programs that promote cross-cultural understanding both within the United States and China and is currently managed by academic, business, and community leaders.

History 
Known for contributions to China's modernization and fostering stronger U.S.-China relations, the 1990 Institute was officially founded in 1990 by a volunteer group of prominent leaders in the community, education, and business sectors.

The Founding Chairman was C.B. Sung, then Chairman of Unison Group, who brokered nearly 40 Sino-foreign joint ventures in China. The Founding President was Dr. Hang-Sheng Cheng, then Director of the Center for Pacific Basin Studies at the Federal Reserve Bank in San Francisco. Other notable early co-founders include Senator Adlai Stevenson III; James Luce; Robert Scalpino, the National Committee on U.S.-China Relations' first chairman; the former U.S. Ambassador to the Asian Development Bank Linda Tsao Yang; Roz Koo, founding President of Self-Help for the Elderly; and architect Billy Lee.

For 30 years, the institute has sought to meet the changing Sino-U.S. needs relative to the times. It began in the 1990s as a think tank dedicated to the examination of current issues in China and produced books and issue papers such as China's Economic Reform by Walter Galenson, which was presented to China's President Jiang Zemin, and Fiscal Policy in China Taxation and Intergovernmental Fiscal Relations by Roy W. Bahl.  In addition, it sponsored conferences and symposia on various topics such as the reform of state-owned enterprise governance in China and "Women, Leadership & Sustainability."

The institute then expanded its range of its activities to become an action-oriented think tank in the 2000s, setting out to improve the educational opportunities for girls, enhancing cross-cultural communications, and launching direct assistance programs and philanthropy initiatives in China through microfinance and environmental initiatives and school construction.

In the 2010s, the Institute slowly gravitated its focus to running national education and cross-cultural programs in the United States. Noting a series of surveys that had shown significant perception gaps between Americans and Chinese, inaccurate cultural portrayals of each country and its people from widespread media sources, and a pressing need to contribute to the world's most important bilateral relationship of the 21st Century, the 1990 Institute developed its "CHINA NOW" initiatives to create more learning opportunities about contemporary China.

Its U.S.-based "CHINA NOW" educational initiatives featured youth exchange programs, online video contests, and teacher training workshops and lesson plan contests on modern China material. In addition, with the goal of building a community of U.S.-China thought leaders, 1990 launched its CHINA NOW Speaker Series, hosting prominent speakers including Hank Paulson, Brian Wong of Alibaba, and Hudson Yang from Fresh Off the Boat.

In 2020, the 1990 Institute embarked on a major review of its purpose and mission. With increasing anti-Asian American sentiment in the U.S. caused by adversarial and competitive tensions between the U.S. and China, the organization expanded its mission to include Asian American issues.

Activities

Discovery Series 
The programs for 2020-2022 include a new Discovery Series that aims to provide a more nuanced and in-depth understanding of contemporary issues affecting Asian Americans and U.S.-China relations. The Discovery Series is a multi-part, multimedia programming initiative with videos and discussions. As of September 2020, there are plans to include: (1) a Video Series on Asian Americans, (2) a Video Series on U.S.-China Relations, and (3) a Discussion Series.

Asian American Video Series (Discovery Series) 

The Video Series on Asian Americans and the issues that affect them is called "See Us, Hear Us, and Understand Us." The overall series will include many short video series that will each have its own theme and will explore that issue, its history, and how it impacts the Asian American community today. The program launched in September 2020 with a three-part series on Asian Americans and voting rights.

College Essay Contest 

This program launched in 2019 and encourages college students to develop a more nuanced understanding of modern China. In its introductory year, the 1990 Institute awarded prizes in three categories: Women's Rights in Modern China, Technology in Modern China, and Economics in Modern China.

CHINA NOW | For Teachers 
The CHINA NOW For Teachers annual workshop brings together U.S.-China experts and U.S. teachers in an interactive forum to discuss current China topics and provides online resources for teaching and lesson plan development. The workshop was launched in 2013. It featured 40-60 teachers each year and included a $5,000 Lesson Plan Contest, where teachers were encouraged to submit lesson plans on modern China. The theme for the first two years was “China’s Growing Global Impact: What It Means for U.S. Teachers and Students.” The 2015 subject theme was "Modern China through the Lens of Social Change and Reform." Themes for the next four years were: “China’s Place in a Changing World Order” (2016), China's Social Kaleidoscope” (2017), “Changing Lives in Modern China” (2018), and “China on the Move” (2019).

For the 2020 Teachers Workshop, the 1990 Institute and Asia Society Northern California formed a partnership to expand the program in breadth and depth. The theme was “Technology and Humanity: Contemporary China and Asia for K-12 Grade Classrooms.”

CHINA NOW | Speaker Series 
The 1990 Institute sought to build a community of U.S.-China thought leaders and host events, power luncheons, and films to engage the larger community across Silicon Valley and the Bay Area. Previous speakers included Hank Paulson, former Secretary of the Treasury and CEO of Goldman Sachs; Brian Wong, Vice President of the Alibaba Group; leading equity analyst Ming Zhao from 86Research, and actor Hudson Yang from Fresh Off the Boat.

Youth Voices on China | Video Contest 
The Youth Voices on China online video contest was launched in 2014 and was one of the 1990 Institute's signature education initiatives to foster better global awareness among young people and inspire them to think deeply about U.S.-China relations. The contest offered $30,000 in cash and prizes and was open to residents age 13–25 in the U.S. and China. It leveraged the power of video to empower youth to share their voices while honing their storytelling skills as well as their social media and marketing proficiency. The contest featured a public vote round, a mentoring round, and even an Oscar acceptance speech writing exercise.  With a star judging panel led by actress/filmmaker Joan Chen  and 30+ prominent Hollywood filmmakers and U.S.-China executives, Youth Voices on China aimed to be engine of media-inspired change and cross-cultural collaboration.

The 2015 inaugural contest topic was "What’s China? Why Understanding China is Important to My Future." Over 80 videos from 109 students representing eight states and 40 schools were submitted, and over 17,000 video views were recorded by a global audience accessing the student films via social media and public voting campaigns.

The 2016 contest focused on sending "Videograms to the White House," where students proposed a cultural exchange idea and urged the President to build a more positive relationship with China. The themes for 2017 and 2018 were “Discover Your China: Travel Stories” and “China: Collected Stories,” respectively.

For 2019, the program was revised and renamed to “1990 Institute Video Contest.” The theme was “What’s in Your Wok?” and showcased how food is reflection of the culture and people of its origin.

America-China Exchange (ACE) 
ACE was a month-long student summer exchange and community service program in Qiaoqi and California. The Institute partnered with the Jiangyin Qiaoqi Primary School, and 120 U.S. and China students and teachers attended yearly to teach English and participate in cross-cultural activities.

School Construction 

To replace two schools destroyed by the Sichuan earthquake in Zhang Jia Yin Township, PaoJi City, a group of skilled volunteers from the U.S. and China worked together to build a green campus. The new campus has a capacity of 350 students will be able to withstand a magnitude 8.0 earthquake.

Biofuels Research 

The institute played a vital role in creating the U.S.-China Green Energy Council, which was launched in San Francisco in 2008 with the focus on increasing energy efficiency in the short term and developing sustainable, carbon-neutral energy sources in the long run. The council brings together leading clean energy experts from business, government, and academia from both the U.S. and China.

The Microfinance Project 

The Pucheng County Women's Sustainable Development Association (PCWSDA) was formed by the institute in 2005 to provide access to capital, business education, and strategy to poor families so that they could establish or expand micro businesses. It distributed over 7,700 loans worth more than $1.9 million. It achieved a 100 percent loan repayment record and these efforts have increased household income by up to 100 percent and improved the families' standard of living. It collaborated with Plan China and the Pucheng County Women's Federation to provide technical and social services to its clients.

Children, Art and the Environment Project (CAEP) 

CAEP promoted friendship and appreciation between the children and teachers in the U.S. and China through the universal language of art. The institute funded the China National Children's Centre (CNCC) which served as a clearinghouse for visiting students from the U.S. Another initiative was the Magic Moment Fellowship, which supported and partially funded students from the U.S. to embark on cultural trips to China. It educated and spread the message of environmental protection among children and youth in both countries too.

Spring Bud (Dragon Fund) 

The program aimed to improve educational opportunities by providing scholarships to girls in rural villages in Gansu and Shaanxi Provinces over a 13-year period, from fourth grade to college. The team aimed to help 1,000 out of 280,000 impoverished girls in Shaanxi Province beginning in 2001. In 2012, with Rosalyn Koo's annual visit, she confirmed the institute had assisted over 1,000 girls and 168 of them had gone on to university studies.

Further reading

"The 1990s Institute: Chinese-Americans Bridge the Pacific," Ch 3 in Norton Wheeler's The Role of American NGOs in China's Modernization: Invited Influence. New York: Routledge, Asia's Transformations,  2012.   (hardback);  (ebook).

Notes

Organizations established in 1989
Organizations based in California
China–United States relations